Ferruccio Lamborghini (born 9 January 1991) is an Italian motorcycle racer who has competed in the 125cc World Championship, the Moto2 World Championship, the Supersport World Championship, the FIM Superstock 1000 Cup and the European Superstock 600 Championship. He won the CIV Moto2 Championship in 2012.

He is the grandson of the founder of Automobili Lamborghini, Ferruccio Lamborghini and the brother of singer Elettra Lamborghini.

Career statistics

Grand Prix motorcycle racing

By season

Races by year
(key) (Races in bold indicate pole position) (Races in italics indicate fastest lap)

Supersport World Championship

Races by year
(key) (Races in bold indicate pole position) (Races in italics indicate fastest lap)

References

External links

1991 births
Living people
Moto2 World Championship riders
125cc World Championship riders
Italian motorcycle racers
FIM Superstock 1000 Cup riders
Sportspeople from Bologna
Supersport World Championship riders